Klčov is a village and municipality in Levoča District in the Prešov Region of central-eastern Slovakia.

History
In historical records the village was first mentioned in 1258.

Geography
The municipality lies at an altitude of 493 metres and covers an area of  (2020-06-30/-07-01).

Population 
It has a population of 641 people (2020-12-31).

Genealogical resources

The records for genealogical research are available at the state archive "Statny Archiv in Levoca, Slovakia"

See also
 List of municipalities and towns in Slovakia

References

External links
https://web.archive.org/web/20071006173841/http://www.statistics.sk/mosmis/eng/run.html
 http://www.obecklcov.szm.sk
Surnames of living people in Klcov

Villages and municipalities in Levoča District